"My Motherland" is a song written for the Chinese movie Battle on Shangganling Mountain (1956). Lyrics were written by Qiao Yu. Music was composed by Liu Chi. Both of them are well known for a number of songs since the 1950s. It remains a popular and famous patriotic song in mainland China, and the signature song for the famous operatic soprano Guo Lanying.

Lyrics and music 
"My Motherland" was initially called "A Big River" by the author, in order to represent the hundreds of rivers that flow in China. The title was changed when it was published with the movie. The song is divided into 3 stanzas. Within each stanza, the soloist sings first before the chorus sings its refrain.

Although the song was written for a movie about Korean War in the 1950s, there is no explicit mention of the war at all. It describes a soldier (or anyone who is away from home) thinking about his home and his family.

The music for solo part has folk song style similar to those in northern China.

Lyrics

Controversy about Lang Lang playing "My Motherland" at state dinner 

On January 19, 2011, Lang Lang played "My Motherland" as President Barack Obama welcomed Hu Jintao at a White House state dinner (many famous Chinese celebrities, including Jackie Chan and Yo-Yo Ma attended, as well as some others.)

On Lang Lang's blog, he put pictures that performed at the White House and wrote that "I soloed 'My Motherland' which in the mind of the Chinese people is one of the most beautiful songs.   Being able to play this song in front of many foreign guests, including the heads of state from around the world, that praises China, and seemingly serenading a strong China and its people in solidarity, I am deeply honored and proud.  I would like to share that day in the White House."

References

External links 
Download audio files
The Original Music Video from the movie

Chinese patriotic songs
Maoist China propaganda songs
Articles containing video clips
Works about the Korean War